The Campeonato Catarinense de Futebol Profissional da Série A de 2021, known as the 2021 Campeonato Catarinense, was the 96th season of Santa Catarina's top-flight football league. The season began on 24 February and ended on 26 May 2021.

On 3 March, FCF suspended the tournament due to the COVID-19 pandemic in Brazil. Although the Campeonato Catarinense was suspended some postponed matches were played. The tournament resumed on 20 March.

In the finals, Avaí defeated the defending champions Chapecoense 3–2 on aggregate to win their 18th title.

Format
The tournament was contested between 12 teams, who first played in a single round-robin tournament. In the first stage, the bottom two teams were relegated to next year's Série B. The final stage was played on a home-and-away two-legged basis. Champions and runners-up qualified for the 2022 Copa do Brasil, while three teams qualified for the 2022 Campeonato Brasileiro Série D.

Participating teams

First stage

Table and Results

Final stage
Starting from the quarter-finals, the teams played a single-elimination tournament. The matches were played on a home-and-away two-legged basis, with the higher-seeded team hosting the second leg. If tied on aggregate, the higher-seeded team would qualified.

Bracket

Quarter-finals

|}

Group A
Originally, the Group A would be played between the first stage winners Chapecoense and the 8th place Hercílio Luz. The match Hercílio Luz v Chapecoense, 0–0, was played on 25 April 2021 at Estádio Aníbal Torres Costa in Tubarão. The match Chapecoense v Hercílio Luz, 1–0, was played on 28 April 2021 at Arena Condá in Chapecó. Chapecoense won 1–0 on aggregate and qualified for the semi-finals. However, on 29 April 2021, the FCF announced that was investigating Hercílio Luz to find out if they potentially fielded an ineligible player (Alisson) against Brusque in the first stage. Due to this, FCF suspended the semi-finals between Marcílio Dias and Chapecoense.

On 4 May 2021, Hercílio Luz were deducted three points and sanctioned with a fine of R$15,000 (reduced later to R$10,000) after they were punished by Tribunal de Justiça Desportiva do Futebol de Santa Catarina (TJD–SC). TJD–SC also annulled the results of the quarter-finals between Chapecoense and Hercílio Luz and ordered that the quarter-finals be replayed between Chapecoense and the new 8th place Figueirense.

Chapecoense qualified for the semi-finals.

Group B

Brusque qualified for the semi-finals.

Group C

Avaí qualified for the semi-finals.

Group D

Marcílio Dias qualified for the semi-finals.

Semi-finals

|}

Group F

Chapecoense qualified for the finals.

Group G

Avaí qualified for the finals.

Notes

Finals

|}

Group H

General table

Top goalscorers

References

Campeonato Catarinense seasons
Campeonato Catarinense